Anja Schocher-Käser (born 4 November 1979) is a Swiss former windsurfer who competed in the 2000 Summer Olympics in Sydney #12 and in the 2004 Summer Olympics in Athen  #14 .

References

External links
 
 
 

1979 births
Living people
Swiss windsurfers
Female windsurfers
Swiss female sailors (sport)
Olympic sailors of Switzerland
Sailors at the 2000 Summer Olympics – Mistral One Design
Sailors at the 2004 Summer Olympics – Mistral One Design